Brian McLaughlin may refer to:

 Brian McLaughlin (footballer born 1954) (1954–2009), Scottish footballer and coach
 Brian McLaughlin (footballer born 1974), former footballer
 Brian McLaughlin (Gaelic footballer), Irish sportsperson who represented Donegal
 Brian J. McLaughlin (born ca. 1957), former Boston City Council member
 Brian M. McLaughlin (born 1952), former American Democratic politician from Flushing, Queens